The French International School MLF Danielle Mitterrand is a French international school in Erbil, Kurdistan Region, Iraq. The French and KRG governments made an agreement to have this school established. Currently it serves up to collège (junior high school). It is affiliated with the Mission laïque française.

Dr. Frédéric Tissot, the consul general of France in Erbil, stated that the purpose of the school is to improve education in Kurdistan. The namesake of the school, Danielle Mitterrand, is known as the "mother of Kurds." In 2009 the school had 70 students taught by French teachers. The annual tuition, as of that year, is $3,000 per student. There are English, Arabic, and Kurdish classes available.

References

External links

 French International School MLF Danielle Mitterrand
 French International School MLF Danielle Mitterrand 
 
 
  "La vie presque normale de l'école française du Kurdistan irakien" (Archive). Agence France Presse at La Dépêche. 29 September 2014.

Buildings and structures in Erbil
Education in Kurdistan Region (Iraq)
International schools in Iraq
Erbil
Educational institutions established in 2009
2009 establishments in Iraqi Kurdistan